The Sib Pal Gi Association (십팔기협회 Dae Han Sibpalki Hyeop Hwe; also The Korea Sibpalki Association) is a Korean martial arts association established in 1981 under the leadership of  Kim Kwang-Seok (Kim Gwang-suk 김광석; 金光錫, b. 1936, style name Haebeom).
Sib Pal Ki (literally "eighteen skills") is a Korean term for "martial arts", either Chinese martial arts or Korean martial arts (as opposed to the Japanese martial arts introduced during the Japanese rule in Korea).

Kim Kwang-Seok had  opened a martial arts school in 1969, having studied martial arts during the late 1950s to middle 1960s under Choi sang-chul, Korean Kungfu master.
In 1986 Korean folklorist Sim U-seong worked together with Kim Kwang-Seok to compare his style with the historical Muyedobotongji or "Comprehensive Illustrated Manual of Martial Arts" of 1790. In the same year, the first public performance of Sib Pal Gi took place at the Batanggol Small Theater in Seoul.

In 2001,  students of Kim Kwang Seok founded the  Sib Pal Gi Preservation Society (십팔기 보존회), dedicated to staging public performances and disseminating public awareness of Korean martial arts in the South Korean public.

It is not clear to which extent the Sib Pal Gi system taught by Kim Kwang-Seok corresponds to the historical 18th-century Korean systems and to which extent the system reflects more modern influence of Chinese martial arts; but the emphasis of Sib Pal Gi in Korea is that of being a "native" system in the sense of avoiding the modern Japanese martial arts which had become mainstream under the Japanese occupation of Korea during the first half of the 20th century. 

The term Sip Pal Gi (십팔기 "Eighteen Skills") in modern Korean martial arts  has come to identify  four separate activities. 
 there are practitioners in South Korea who follow the practices of an eclectic Chinese system of armed and unarmed Martial Arts   termed Sip Pal Gi owing to the number of systems, methods and practices in its curriculum.  Individual schools will vary in the weapons used and the manner of practice. 
A second and more general application of the term is as a  label to identify Chinese martial arts generically, much like "kung fu" has become an umbrella term for them in the West.
Also, there are small groups of practitioners who use the term Sip Pal Gi historically, for the attempted reconstruction of 18th-century Korean martial arts based on the historical manuals, specifically the Muyesinbo, much in the same way as martial arts reconstruction in the West.
Lastly, the style usually spelled Sipalki, of dubious relation with the Chosun period martial arts, taught by Yoo Soo Nam.

See also
Eighteen Arms of Wushu
Korean martial arts
Korean swordsmanship

References

 Kim Kwang-sŏk and  Sim U-sŏng (1987), "Technical analysis of the 'Comprehensive Illustrated Manual of Martial Arts'" (Muye tobo tʻongji : silgi haeje), Tongmunsŏn (東文選; Dongmunseon Books), Seoul.
Kim Kwang-sŏk (1992), "Essentials of Fist Methods" (Kwŏnpŏp yogyŏl 권법요결 拳法要訣), Tongmunsŏn, Seoul.
Kim Kwang-sŏk (1995), "The National Sword: teaching Joseon-era swordsmanship" (Ponʾguk kŏm : Chosŏn kŏmpŏp kyojŏng 本國劍 : 朝鮮劍法敎程), Tongmunsŏn.
Kim Kwang-sŏk (2002), "Joseon-era Spear and Staff Syllabus" (Chosŏn chʻangbong kyojŏng 朝鮮槍捧教程),  Tongmunsŏn munye sinsŏ [東文選 文藝新書] vol. 208, Seoul, .

External links
  Sib Pal Gi Association (sibpalki.or.kr)
  Sib Pal Gi Preservation Society (sippalki.com)
Kim Gwang-suk (Sibpalki Australia)
Kim Gwang-suk (Hwarang Foundation, Amsterdam)

ARGENTINA
 Reseña sobre Sipalki por Andres Esquivel

South Korean martial arts
Martial arts organizations